Zaklopača  may refer to:

 Zaklopača (Grocka), a suburb of Belgrade, Serbia
 Zaklopača (Kraljevo), a village in Serbia
 Zaklopača, Bosnia and Herzegovina, the location of Zaklopača massacre
 Zaklopača, Croatia, a village in Lika, Croatia